Charles Griffith may refer to:

Politics
 Charles Griffith (Australian politician) (1808–1863), Australian politician and pastoralist
 Charles Duncan Griffith (1830–1906), British colonial administrator and army officer
 Charles McDonald Griffith, Barbadian politician

Sports
 Charles Griffith (Australian cricketer) (1889-1928), Australian cricketer
 Charles Griffith (judoka) (born 1963), Venezuelan judoka
 Charlie Griffith (born 1938), Barbadian cricketer

Other
 Charles Griffith (priest) (1857–1934), Dean of Llandaff, 1913–1926
 Charles B. Griffith (1930–2007), American screenwriter

See also
 Charles Griffiths (disambiguation)